Togrul Farman oglu Narimanbekov (7 August 1930 – 2 June 2013) was one of the prominent modern Azerbaijani artists.

History
Narimbanbekov was born in Baku.  His father, Farman Narimanbekov, who hailed from Shusha, studied in Toulouse; in 1929 he came back to Baku and participated in the construction of Mingachevir Hydro Power Plant, but in the 1930s was sentenced to imprisonment. His wife Irma Laroudé, a Frenchwoman, was exiled to Uzbekistan and stayed there till 1961.

Toghrul Narimanbekov studied at Azerbaijan Art School named after Azim Azimzade, then, from 1950 to 1955, at Lithuania Institute of Fine Arts.

He was the laureate of the USSR State Prize (1980) and People's Artist of Azerbaijan (1967). He lived in Paris and had a French citizenship until his death.

He assumed that, it is necessary for arts to return to origins of national culture. He described his creativity as a combination of abstract and figurative arts.

Asmar Narimanbekova, his daughter from the first marriage to Elmira Hüseynova, is an Honoured Artist of Azerbaijan and associate professor of Azerbaijan State Academy of Fine Arts.

François Narimanbekov is his son, born on 24 May 2001 of his second marriage with Sevil Narimanbekova. Besides artistic activity, Narimanbekov had excellent voice and he performed various arias of Azerbaijani and foreign composers in his youth. In August 2010, he was awarded the Order of the Badge of Honour of Azerbaijan.  He died, aged 82, in Paris.

He is brother of Vidadi Narimanbekov, a member of Narimanbekov family.

References

External links
Official Website 
А. А. Дехтярь. Тогрул Нариманбеков
Toghrul Narimanbeyov (in Russian)

Azerbaijani painters
Soviet painters
1930 births
2013 deaths
Artists from Baku
Azerbaijani emigrants to France
Recipients of the Istiglal Order
Vilnius Academy of Arts alumni
Burials at Passy Cemetery
Narimanbekov family